The Tell-Tale Step is a 1917 American silent crime drama film directed by Burton George and starring Pat O'Malley, Shirley Mason and Guido Colucci.

Cast
 Pat O'Malley as Hugh Graham
 Shirley Mason as Lucia
 Guido Colucci as Giovanni Pallazzi 
 Charles Sutton as Luigi
 Robert Huggins as Pietro
 Nellie Grant as Rosetta
 Bigelow Cooper as Dimitri
 Sally Crute as Beverly Winton
 Jessie Stevens as Hugh's Mother
 Leonora von Ottinger as Mrs. Arbuthnot
 Grace Morrissey as Miss Stryver
 Robert Brower as Doctor Oppenheim

References

Bibliography
 Giorgio Bertellini. Italy in Early American Cinema: Race, Landscape, and the Picturesque. Indiana University Press, 2010.

External links
 

1917 films
1917 crime films
American silent feature films
American crime films
American black-and-white films
Films directed by Burton George
Edison Studios films
1910s English-language films
1910s American films
Silent crime films